Aviv Hadad (born 4 February 1984) is an Israeli football player who is of a Tunisian-Jewish origin. He is currently playing for Hapoel Baqa al-Gharbiyye.

Career
Hadad began his career in the youth team of Maccabi Tel Aviv. Between 2003 and 2007, Hadad was loaned to 3 different clubs: Maccabi Kiryat Gat, Ironi Ramat Hasharon and Hapoel Ashkelon. At the beginning of the 2007–08 season he returned to his boyhood club and Played three games in the Toto Cup, but was loaned to Hakoah Amidar Ramat Gan, which won the league and was promoted. The following season, still playing for Hakoah Amidar Ramat Gan, the club finished second-bottom and lost the relegation promotion and dropped back to the Liga Leumit.

At the beginning of the 2009–10 season Hadad was transferred to Bnei Yehuda Tel Aviv.

Honours
Liga Leumit
Winner (2): 2007–08, 2014–15
Israel State Cup
Runner-up (2): 2007, 2010
Toto Cup Leumit
Runner-up (2): 2007, 2014

External links

1984 births
Israeli Jews
Living people
Israeli footballers
Maccabi Tel Aviv F.C. players
Maccabi Kiryat Gat F.C. players
Hapoel Nir Ramat HaSharon F.C. players
Hapoel Ashkelon F.C. players
Hakoah Maccabi Amidar Ramat Gan F.C. players
Bnei Yehuda Tel Aviv F.C. players
Hapoel Bnei Lod F.C. players
Ironi Nesher F.C. players
Hapoel Umm al-Fahm F.C. players
Hapoel Hod HaSharon F.C. players
Hapoel Shefa-'Amr F.C. players
Hapoel Bnei Zalafa F.C. players
Maccabi Ironi Kiryat Ata F.C. players
Hapoel Ironi Baqa al-Gharbiyye F.C. players
Liga Leumit players
Israeli Premier League players
Israeli people of Tunisian-Jewish descent
Israeli settlers
Association football defenders